is a Japanese professional baseball catcher. He was born on June 24, 1988. He is currently playing for the Chiba Lotte Marines of the NPB.

References

1988 births
Living people
People from Tokyo
Aoyama Gakuin University alumni
Japanese baseball players
Nippon Professional Baseball catchers
Chiba Lotte Marines players